There are a number of student organizations at University of North Carolina at Charlotte.

The university features a variety of student journals, magazines, and newspapers.

The campus also includes several fraternities, sororities and secret societies.

Academic (pre-professional)
 Allied Health Club (AHC)
 Alpha Kappa Psi
 American Institute of Architecture Students (AIAS)
 American Medical Student Association (AMSA)
 American Marketing Association (AMA)
 American Society of Civil Engineers (ASCE)
 American Society of Mechanical Engineers (ASME)
 Anthropology Club (HUMAN Holistic Understanding of Mankind, Anthropology, and Nature) 
 Arnold Air Society
 Associated General Contractors of America (AGC)
 Association for Computing Machinery (ACM)
 Association for Computing Machinery - Women in Computing (ACM-W)
 Association of Nursing Students (ANS)
 BSW Social Work Club
 Charlotte Area Robotics (CAR)
 Charlotte Geography Club
 Charlotte Postsecondary HOSA
 Collegiate Middle Level Association
 Collegiate Music Educators National Conference
 Criminal Justice Association
 Financial Management Association (FMA)
 Forensics
 Gamma Iota Sigma fraternity (Risk Management and Insurance)
 Health Communication Student Community (HCSC)
 Institute of Electrical and Electronics Engineers (IEEE)
 Institute of Transportation Engineers (ITE)
 International Studies Student Association
 Kinesiology Student Organization (KSO)
 Los Libertadores Society
 Minority Association of Pre-medical Students (MAPS)
 National Art Education Association (Student Chapter)
 National Society of Black Engineers (NSBE)
 National Society of Professional Engineers (NSPE)
 NinerOnline
 North Carolina Student Legislature
 North Carolina World Trade Association (49er Chapter)
 Potter Watch- The Official Harry Potter Club of UNC Charlotte
 Pre-Law Society
 Pre-Pharmacy Student Association
 Psychology Club
 Public Relations Student Society of America (PRSSA)
 Society for Human Resource Management (SHRM)
 Society of Automotive Engineers
 Society of Physics Students
 Society of Women Engineers
 Sport Marketing Association (SMA)
 Student Association of Sociology (SAS)
 Student Council for Exceptional Children (SCEC)
 Students in Free Enterprise (SIFE)
 Student National Education Association
 Theta Tau Professional Engineering Fraternity
 Undergraduate Business Association
 Undergraduate Student National Dental Association
 University Honors Program Student Association
 Young Entrepreneurs Association

Graduate
 Graduate and Professional Student Government (GPSG)
 American Society of Precision Engineering (ASPE)
 Association of Biology Graduate Students
 Association of Chemistry Graduate Students
 Association of Graduate Information Technology Students
 Association of Nanoscience Graduate Students (ANGS)
 Curriculum and Instruction Graduate Student Professional Association
 Educational Leadership Graduate Student Council
 English Graduate Student Association (EGSA)
 Gamma Theta Upsilon
 Graduate and Professional Student Government (GPSG)
 Graduate Association of Student Philosophers
 Graduate History Association
 Graduate Public Health Association (GPHA)
 Graduate Public Policy Association (GPPA)
 Graduate Social Work Association (GSWA)
 Graduate Sociological Association
 Health Psychology Graduate Student Association (HPGSA)
 Industrial/Organizational Psychology Graduate Association (IOPGA)
 SPIE/OSA Student Chapter at UNC Charlotte (SPIE) (Formerly: International Society for Optical Engineering)
 Master of Public Administration Student Group (MPASG)
 Master's of Architecture Student Society (MASS)
 Mathematics Graduate Student Association
 Mu Tau Beta
 Multicultural Graduate Student Organization
 Organizational Science Graduate Association (OSGA)
 Sigma Phi Omega (Gamma Psi chapter)

Greek organizations

Honor Society
 Alpha Kappa Psi
 Alpha Phi Sigma Honor Society
 Alpha Psi Omega
 Beta Alpha Psi (Accounting)
 Eta Kappa Nu
 Golden Key International Honour Society
 Lambda Pi Eta Honor Society (Communications)
 National Residence Hall Honorary
 National Society of Collegiate Scholars
 Omicron Delta Kappa
 Order of Omega- Greek Honor Society
 Phi Alpha Theta - History Honor Society
 Phi Kappa Phi Honor Society
 Pi Sigma Alpha fraternity
 Psi Chi Honor Society (Psychology)
 Sigma Alpha Lambda Honor Society
 Sigma Pi Sigma fraternity
 Sigma Tau Delta Honor Society
 Tau Beta Pi Honor Society
 Tri Beta
University Honors College Council

Interest
 318
 49er Social and Ballroom Dance Club
 49th Measure
 49th Security Division
 A.C.E.S Hip Hop Dance Team
 Art of Light Photography Club
 Art and Mindfulness
 Bass Rats
 C.H.A.I.N. Reaction
 Charlotte Football Initiative Students
 Collegiate Starleague(CSL) #Rise
 EARTH Club
 F.A.M.E. One
Find Yourself in Fashion (FYI Fashion)
 Free Thinkers Alliance
 Game Developers at UNCC
 Horsepower Addicts
 Hypeman Entertainment
 Japanese Animation and Manga Society
 Linux Users Group
 Miner-MUG
 NinerOnline.com
 Non-Traditional Student Organization (NTSO)
 Poker Club
 Radio Free Charlotte
 Resident Students Association (RSA)
 Scratch Marks
 Student Organization of Meteorology (STORM)
 Student Art Society
 Student 49er Club
 Student Technologies, Resources and Promotions (STRAP)
 Tablespoon of Talent Improvisation Troupe
 Tantrum Hip Hop Dance Troupe
 The Guild
 THE RUSH (The Gold Rush)
 Ukulele Club
 X-Factor Modeling Troupe
 Yoga for All

International
 Arab Student Organization (Arabica)
 Asian Student Association
 Brazilian Student Association (BRAZA)
 Caribbean Connection
 UNCC CSSA - Chinese Students and Scholars Association at UNC Charlotte
Ekush Bangladesh Student Organization
 French Club
 German Club
 Indian-American Student Association (AAWAZ)
 International Club
 International Students Christian Fellowship
 International Studies Student Association
 Iranian Student Organization
 Japanese Animation and Manga Society
 Korean Student Association
 Korean American Student Association
 Liberian Student Association
 Model United Nations
 Nihon Club
 Organization of African Students (OAS)
 Russian Club
 Taiwanese Student Organization
 Triveni
 Turkish Student Association
 Vietnamese Student Association

Multicultural
 Black Student Union (BSU)
 Triveni (Indian Student Organization) - http://www.triveni.info
 Chi Upsilon Sigma (Corazones Unidos Siempre)
 Collegiate 100
 Collegiate Chapter of the National Coalition of 100 Black Women
 Hillel
 Hmong Student Association
 Latin American Student Organization (LASO)
 Los Libertadores Society
 NAACP
 National Society of Black Engineers (NSBE)
 Native American Student Organization (NASO)
 PRIDE
 TIARA (Official Interest Group of Mu Sigma Upsilon)
 Zeta Phi Beta sorority
 UNCC I.C.E

Other
 Campus Activities Board (CAB)
 Carolina Academic Team
 Graduate and Professional Student Government (GPSG)
 Student Activity Fees Commission (SAFC)
 Student Government Association (SGA) Executive Branch
 Student Government Association (SGA) Judicial Branch
 Student Government Association (SGA) Legislative Branch
 Student Media

Political
 College Republicans
 College Democrats
 Feminist Union
 Student Organization for Non-Partisan Political Action (N-PPA)

Religious (spiritual)
 Alpha Omega
 Baptist Campus Ministry
 Believers in Christ on Campus
 Campus Bible Fellowship
 Campus Crusade for Christ
 Chi Alpha Christian Fellowship
 Element College Community
 Every Nation Campus Ministry
 Fellowship of Christian Engineers  
 Greater Faith Christian Fellowship
 Hillel
 Hindu Students Council
 ImpactUNCC
 International Students Christian Fellowship
 InterVarsity Christian Fellowship
 Mission 28
 Muslim Students Association
 Niner Christian Life
 Road to Damascus Campus Outreach
 United
 United Christian Fellowship (UCF)
 Unrestricted
 Voices of Eden Gospel Choir
 Young Life

Secret Societies
Bonnie's Boys
The Society of 49
Order of the Barnstormers
Halton Hellraisers
The 49th Hour
Diu Memoriae Consilium

Service
 Allied Health Society
Alpha Phi Omega
 Circle K International
 Fire and Safety Technologist (FAST)
 HomeWork
 Niner Nation Foundation
 Rotaract
 Student Alumni Ambassadors
 Students In Free Enterprise (SIFE)
 V-Day
 The Veterans Club

Sports
 Badminton
 Bowling Club
 Club Baseball
 Club Swimming
 Cycling Club
 Equestrian Club
 Fencing Club
 Ice Hockey Club
 Jiu Jitsu Club
 Kendo Club
 Kung Fu Club
 Men's Lacrosse
 Men's Soccer Club
 Men's Rugby Club
 Snowboarding Club
 Table Tennis Club
 Tennis Club
 Triathlon Club
 Women's Club Basketball
 Women's Club Soccer
 Women's Club Softball
 Women's Lacrosse Club
 Women's Rugby Club
 Women's Volleyball Club

References

External links
List Of UNC Charlotte Student Organizations

University of North Carolina at Charlotte
University of North Carolina at Charlotte